Turturoena, commonly called bronze-naped pigeon, is a pigeon subgenus comprising three species: the eastern bronze-naped pigeon, the western bronze-naped pigeon, and the São Tomé bronze-naped pigeon.

References

Columba (genus)
Columbidae
Birds of Sub-Saharan Africa
Animal subgenera